Aron Lvovich Sheinman (24 December 1885 – 22 May 1944) was a Bolshevik Revolutionary and Soviet official.

Aron Sheinman was born in Suwałki in a Lithuanian Jewish family. He was twice chairman of Gosbank, the central bank of the Soviet Union (1921–1924 and 1926–1929).

In 1922 Lenin wrote him a scathing letter accusing him of being a "communist-mandarin" stating that Gosbank was "a bureaucratic paper game" suggesting that Sheinman had become blinded to the truth by being too engrossed in "the sweet communist-official lies".

In 1937-1939 he was the chairman of the director of the London department of "Intourist". In October 1939 he was recalled from London, but refused to return to the USSR. In 1939 he received British citizenship. He died in London on May 22, 1944.

References

1885 births
1944 deaths
People from Suwałki
People from Suwałki Governorate
Bolsheviks
Russian bankers
Chairmen of the Board of Gosbank
Russian business executives
Jews from the Russian Empire

Soviet Jews
Soviet people of Polish-Jewish descent
Soviet defectors to the United Kingdom
Naturalised citizens of the United Kingdom